
Dzūkija National Park - a national park in Dzūkija, Lithuania, was established in 1991 in order to preserve the pine forests, the landscape, and the villages of the region.  The area encompasses 584.53 square kilometers on the banks of the Nemunas River.

The park is the largest protected area in Lithuania. It belongs to both the Association of Baltic National Parks and the Federation of European National Parks.

Features
The park enjoys a more continental climate than other parts of the country. Its most distinctive landscapes are the mainland dune massifs located in Marcinkonys, Lynežeris, Grybaulia, and Šunupis.

Settlements

The administrative center of the park is in Marcinkonys and the other important town is Merkinė. The ethnographic village of Zervynos can be found within the park.

See also
 List of national parks in the Baltics

References

External links
 Dzukija National Park
 BirdLife IBA Factsheet 
 Dzukija National Park on Litauen Netz
 Accommodation in Dzukija National Park

National parks of Lithuania
Protected areas established in 1991
1991 establishments in Lithuania
Tourist attractions in Alytus County